{{Infobox film
| name           = Rollerball
| image          = RollerballPoster.jpg
| alt            = 
| caption        = Theatrical release poster by Bob Peak
| director       = Norman Jewison
| producer       = Norman Jewison
| screenplay     = William Harrison
| based_on       = 
| starring       = 
| music          = André Previn
| cinematography = Douglas Slocombe
| editing        = Antony Gibbs
| studio = Algonquin Films
| distributor    = United Artists
| released       = 
| runtime        = 129 minutes<ref>{{cite web | url=http://bbfc.co.uk/releases/rollerball-1970-3 | title=Rollerball' (AA) | work=British Board of Film Classification | date=June 25, 1975 | access-date=June 20, 2015}}</ref>
| country        = United Kingdom United States
| language       = English
| budget         = $5-6 million
| gross          = $30 million
}}Rollerball is a 1975 science fiction sports film directed and produced by Norman Jewison. It stars James Caan, John Houseman, Maud Adams, John Beck, Moses Gunn and Ralph Richardson. The screenplay, written by William Harrison, adapted his own short story "Roller Ball Murder", which had first appeared in the September 1973 issue of Esquire.Although Rollerball had a largely American cast, a Canadian director, and was released by the American company United Artists, it was produced in London and Munich.

Plot
In 2018, Jonathan E. is the team captain and veteran star of the Houston Rollerball team. Mr. Bartholomew, chairman of the Energy Corporation and team sponsor, offers Jonathan a lavish retirement package if Jonathan will announce his retirement during an upcoming television special detailing his career. Jonathan refuses, and requests to see his former wife Ella, who had been taken from him some years earlier by a corporate executive who wanted her for himself.

Jonathan goes to a library, where he finds that all books have been digitized and edited to suit the corporations, and are now stored on supercomputers at large protected corporate locations. Jonathan's friend and former coach Cletus, now an Energy executive, warns him that the Executive Committee is afraid of him, though he cannot find out why.

Rollerball soon degrades into senseless violence as the rules are changed just to force Jonathan out. The Semi-final match of Houston vs. Tokyo is played with no penalties and limited substitutions in the hope Jonathan will be injured and forced out before the championship game. The brutality of the match kills several players and leaves Jonathan's best friend and teammate Moonpie in a coma.

In a teleconference, the Executive Committee decides that the next game will be played with no penalties, no substitutions, and no time limit in the hope that Jonathan will be killed during the game. Jonathan's popularity and longevity as a player threaten the underlying agenda of Rollerball: to demonstrate the futility of individualism.

Jonathan makes his way to Geneva to access the world's repository of all human knowledge, a central supercomputer known as "Zero," only to find its memory corrupted. Afterwards, Jonathan receives a visit from his former wife Ella, who has been sent to convince him to retire and to make it clear that the coming game will be "to the death". Jonathan realizes his wife's visit was set up by the Executives, and erases a long-cherished movie of the two of them, stating, "I just wanted you on my side." Jonathan decides that despite the dangers, he will play in the Houston versus New York championship game.

The final match devolves into a gladiatorial fight. Jonathan is soon the only player left on the track for Houston, while a skater and a biker remain from New York. After a violent struggle in front of Mr. Bartholomew's box, Jonathan kills the skater and takes the ball. The biker charges, and Jonathan knocks him off the bike and pins the biker down. He raises the ball over his head, then pauses. Refusing to kill his fallen opponent, Jonathan gets to his feet and makes his way to the goal, slamming the ball home and scoring the game's only point. After a bloody match which sees all of his teammates killed or injured, Jonathan takes a victory lap as the crowd chants his name, first softly, then louder, and finally as a roar while Mr. Bartholomew hastily exits the stands.

Cast

ProductionRollerballs arena sequences were shot at the Rudi-Sedlmayer-Halle in Munich, Germany. This hall was selected because it was the only sports arena in the world with a near-circular profile, which the production could take over and re-dress for shooting.

The then-new BMW Headquarters and Museum buildings in Munich appear as the headquarters buildings of the Energy Corporation at the Olympiapark, Munich. Scenes were also filmed at Fawley Power Station, near Southampton. The sequence where Jonathan E. visits Geneva to consult with Zero the supercomputer concerning corporate decisions features exterior shots of the Palace of Nations.

Recognizing their contribution to the film's many crucial action sequences, Rollerball was the first major Hollywood production to give screen credit to its stunt performers. The film was shot in 35mm with a 1.85 aspect ratio but was released in some theaters in 70mm with a 2:1 aspect ratio.

The game of Rollerball was so realistic that the cast, extras, and stunt personnel played it between takes on the set. At the time of the film's release, Howard Cosell interviewed Norman Jewison and James Caan on ABC's Wide World of Sports, showing clips from the film and with the two of them explaining the rules of the game. Audiences who saw the film so loved the action of the game that Jewison was contacted multiple times by promoters, requesting that the "rights to the game" be sold so that real Rollerball leagues might be formed. Jewison was outraged, as the entire point of the movie was to show the "sickness and insanity of contact sports and their allure."

English pro wrestler Mark Rocco was a stuntman for the film. He used the "Rollerball" name as his nickname.

Music
Bach's Toccata and Fugue in D minor is performed on organ by Simon Preston during the opening title sequence and again at the final scene, bookending the film. Adagio in G minor by Albinoni/Giazotto, and the Largo movement from Shostakovich's Symphony No. 5 are also used to establish tone, mood, and atmosphere for certain scenes in the film. The classical music was performed by the London Symphony Orchestra, conducted by André Previn, who also wrote the "Executive Party" music for the film and the corporate anthems performed before certain matches.

Reception

Box office
The film earned $6.2 million in theatrical rentals at the North American box office.

Critical response
Vincent Canby of The New York Times was unimpressed:
All science-fiction can be roughly divided into two types of nightmares. In the first the world has gone through a nuclear holocaust and civilization has reverted to a neo-stone Age. In the second, of which "Rollerball" is an elaborate and very silly example, all of mankind's problems have been solved but at the terrible price of individual freedom. ... The only way science-fiction of this sort makes sense is as a comment on the society for which it's intended, and the only way "Rollerball" would have made sense in a satire of our national preoccupation with televised professional sports, particularly weekend football.  Yet "Rollerball" isn't a satire. It's not funny at all and, not being funny, it becomes, instead, frivolous.

Gene Siskel of the Chicago Tribune gave the film 2 stars out of 4 and called it "a movie in love with itself" and "vapid, pretentious, and arrogant. Not even John Houseman's fine performance as a villainous corporate director is sufficient to make Rollerball tolerable. The only way to enjoy it, I suppose, is to cheer at the rollerball game's mayhem." Arthur D. Murphy of Variety, wrote that it "packs an emotional and intellectual wallop" and that James Caan gave an "excellent performance". Charles Champlin of the Los Angeles Times was also positive, calling it "a fresh, unusual and stimulating movie. In its portraying of the vast and essentially stateless multinational corporations, Rollerball plays off developments which have come since Huxley's and Orwell's time." Jonathan Rosenbaum of The Monthly Film Bulletin panned Rollerball as "A classic demonstration of how several millions of dollars can be unenjoyably wasted ... this glib fable seems to be aiming at a simplified version of A Clockwork Orange without any intimations of wit or satire to carry the vague moralistic message."

James Monaco wrote that Rollerball "like most paranoid fantasies offers no hope: If James Caan can't beat the system, who can?"TV Guide gave the film three out of four stars; it said "the performances of Caan and Richardson are excellent, and the rollerball sequences are fast-paced and interesting." Jay Cocks of Time said Caan looked "unconvinced and uncomfortable" as Jonathan E.Filmink said the film "launched the dystopian sports movie genre and a series of rip-offs (Death Race 2000, etc) – most of which, to be frank, were a lot more fun than Rollerball, which could have stood to be a little less important and a little trashier."

On Rotten Tomatoes,  the film has an approval rating of 69% based on reviews from 35 critics, with an average rating of 6.2/10. The site's consensus reads: "In Rollerball, social commentary collides with high-speed action – and the audience is the winner." On Metacritic the film has a score of 56 out of 100 based on reviews from 11 critics, indicating "mixed or average reviews".

American Film Institute lists
 AFI's 100 Years ... 100 Thrills – Nominated
 AFI's 100 Years ... 100 Cheers – Nominated
 AFI's 10 Top 10 – Nominated Science Fiction Film

In 1977, Caan himself rated the film 8 out of 10, saying he "couldn't do much with the character."

Video game
In 1985, IJK Software produced a game called Rocketball for the Commodore 64 computer, with the scoring rules based on the game in the movie. In 1989, Microïds published an unofficial successor called Killerball for the Atari ST, Amiga, Amstrad CPC, and MS-DOS.

In 1997, Z-Axis Games was developing an official Rollerball video game adaptation based on the film As part of MGM Interactive video game showcase lineup. The game's promise was to recreate the action of the futuristic game played in the movie, and it was set 10 years after the events of the film in the 2098 Rollerball season, where the player would be in charge of managing their Rollerball teams around the world, made up of Rollerball players with roles such as strikers, enforcers, guard, and other players who compete using jet bikes and magnetic in-line skates. Rollerball: The Video Game was slated to be released for PlayStation, PC, and Nintendo 64 on the first quarter of 1998, but was delayed to mid-1998 and then was canceled due to the publisher, MGM Interactive, going bankrupt.

In 2004, I-play developed and published a Rollerball game for mobile phones. It is based on the 1975 film, rather than the 2002 remake of the same name.Speedball and its sequel Speedball 2: Brutal Deluxe are said to have been heavily inspired by Rollerball, though Bitmap Brothers co-founder Mike Montgomery denies this, saying Speedball's similarities to the film are more of a coincidence.

See also
 List of American films of 1975
 Rollerball (2002 film), a remake of the 1975 film
 Death Race 2000, a dystopian science-fiction sports film released two months before Rollerball 
 Futuresport'', a 1998 TV movie with a similar premise
 Rollerball (chess variant), a chess variant inspired by the film

References

External links
 
 
  (for the short story on which the film is based)
 The Evolution of Rollerball A Summary of Rules of Rollerball from Book to Films.

1975 films
1970s science fiction action films
1970s dystopian films
American science fiction action films
1970s English-language films
American dystopian films
Fictional ball games
Films about competitions
Films based on science fiction short stories
Films directed by Norman Jewison
Films scored by André Previn
Films set in 2018
Films set in Houston
Films set in New York City
Films set in Tokyo
Films set in the future
Films shot in Munich
Films shot in London
Roller derby films
Roller skating films
Films shot at Pinewood Studios
United Artists films
Films about death games
1970s American films